= Feeder road =

A feeder road may refer to:

- Frontage road, a road which runs parallel with high-speed roads, allowing easier access to local amenities
- Spur (road), a short road which provides specific access to one place, such as a sports venue or major business hub
- A secondary road which "feeds" traffic to main highways and freeways
